Migouel Alfarela (born 15 February 1997) is a French professional footballer who plays as a forward for Ligue 2 club SC Bastia.

Career
Alfarela joined the youth academy of Le Havre at the age of 7, and stayed with them for almost 15 years before being released without signing a professional contract. Alfarela started working in construction, and briefly gave up on football. However, in 2019 he signed with Annecy FC in the Championnat National 2 and helped them get promoted as a mainstay on the team. On 8 July 2021, he signed his first professional contract with Paris FC until June 2023. He made his professional debut with Paris FC in a 4–0 league win over Grenoble on 24 July 2021, scoring a goal. On 28 June 2022, he was transferred to SC Bastia with whom he signed a contract for the next two seasons plus one in option.

Personal life
Born in France, Alfarela is of Portuguese descent.

References

External links
 
 Paris FC Profile
 Ligue 2 Transfer map 2022-2023 season

1997 births
Living people
People from Montivilliers
French people of Portuguese descent
Sportspeople from Seine-Maritime
French footballers
Footballers from Normandy
Association football forwards
Paris FC players
FC Annecy players
Le Havre AC players
SC Bastia players
Ligue 2 players
Championnat National players
Championnat National 2 players
Championnat National 3 players